Moses Bilsky (10 December 1829 – 4 January 1923) was a Canadian merchant and community leader who was believed to be the first Jewish settler in Ottawa, Ontario.

Life and career 

Born in Kuvno, Lithuania, Moses was fourteen years old when he, along with his father Ely Bilsky, migrated to Canada in 1845. They first moved to Montreal, before settling in Kemptville, Ontario. Eventually his father decided to move to Palestine to spend his remaining days, leaving his son in the care of relatives living in Brooklyn, New York. In either 1856 or 1857, Moses decided to move back to Canada, and was attracted to the city of Ottawa. He would become the first Jewish settler in the city.

In the 1860s, Moses headed west to make a fortune in the Gold Rush. Eventually he returned to the East Coast, where he met his wife and started a family, and then moved to Ottawa with his family and opened a pawn shop in 1877. He later created a second business, a jewelry store, with his son Alexander in 1901 to form M. Bilsky and Son Limited. Both stores, located on Rideau Street, were successful. When Moses retired from the business in 1915, his business became known as Bilsky Limited.

Involvement in the Jewish Community 

As Ottawa transformed from a bytown to the capital of Canada, Moses helped establish the Jewish community in the city. He established the first place of worship within his own residence. Once the Adath Jeshurun congregation outgrew his home in 1895, he helped found the first synagogue next to his shop on Murray Street, and later a more extravagant synagogue on King Edward Avenue in 1902. Not only was his home used as a place of worship for a period of time, but it was also used as a refuge for recently arrived Jewish immigrants. He and his wife welcomed many strangers into their home and helped them find work and establish new lives in Ottawa. He travelled to New York in order to acquire a Torah for his congregation, and would help transform the deceased to the closet Jewish community.

Personal

In 1874, 43-year-old Moses met 17-year-old Pauline Reich, and they married within the year. In 1876, their first child, a son named Alexander, was born in New York.  They would eventually have eleven more children. Soon after the birth of his first son, he moved his young family back to Ottawa where he started his business. Moses would spend most of the rest of his life in Ottawa, except for a period when he and his family lived in Mattawa (1882 to 1885) and Montreal (1885 to 1891).

One of his daughters, Lillian Freiman (1885–1940), followed in her father's involvement in philanthropy.  She served as head of the Canadian branch of WIZO and was recognized for her services for war veterans when she was awarded the Order of the British Empire.

Notes

References

External links 
 Biography at the Dictionary of Canadian Biography Online

1829 births
1923 deaths
Lithuanian Jews
Lithuanian emigrants to Canada
Canadian merchants
Businesspeople from Ottawa
Jews and Judaism in Ottawa